Eois lilacina is a moth in the  family Geometridae. It is found in Peru.

Subspecies
Eois lilacina lilacina (south-eastern Peru)
Eois lilacina condensata (Warren, 1907) (Peru)
Eois lilacina inviolata (Prout, 1910) (Peru)

References

Moths described in 1904
Eois
Moths of South America